WNIL is an AM radio station located in Niles, Michigan and broadcasting to the Niles-Buchanan region airing a soft adult contemporary format. It broadcasts on AM frequency 1290 kHz and 107.5 MHz; it is under ownership of Marion R. Williams.

History
WNIL began its broadcasting activities in 1956 under an unknown format but in 1964, it was notable when Tommy James & the Shondells recorded their hit "Hanky Panky" (it was a summer hit in 1966 and the studio was located at Sycamore and 5th Street). In the 1990s, it dropped its music format in favor of sports programming. In 1999, the sports format was dropped in favor of oldies, supplied from Jones Radio Networks' Good Time Oldies satellite feed. In June 1999, the FCC approved a license transfer from its original owner Niles Broadcasting to Pathfinder Communications (now Federated Media) along with sister station WAOR (then at 95.3 FM, now WTRC-FM).

Less than a year later, WNIL changed affiliations to ABC Radio's "Memories/Unforgettable Favorites" (a soft rock/AC and oldies hybrid) and ran that feed even throughout the merger with "Stardust" and the name change to Timeless Classics/Timeless Favorites. When 2007 began, local newscasts and talk programs were discontinued, making it an all-music station. However, in March 2007, the Timeless radio format was dropped in favor of syndicated talk programming. In October 2010, the format was changed to Christian radio, branded as "The Mighty 1290 - Spirited Talk Radio", focusing on "Faith, and Family Values".

In the summer of 2012, WNIL, along with sister station WAOR (now at 95.7 FM), switched once again to a sports format.  Most programming came from Fox Sports Radio, except for the Jim Rome show from CBS Sports Radio. In April 2014 WNIL and WAOR switched affiliations to ESPN Radio. A month later, on May 19, Federated Media announced the sale of WNIL to Marion R. Williams, who already owns WSMK (99.1 FM) in Buchanan; this followed the sale of WAOR to St. Joseph Catholic Radio a week earlier. The deal was consummated on August 29, 2014, at a purchase price of $225,000.

On August 29, 2014 WNIL changed their format to news/talk, simulcasting WTRC-FM 95.3 Niles, Michigan.

On October 1, 2014 WNIL split from its simulcast with WTRC-FM and changed their format to a soft AC/oldies mix.

References

External links
Michiguide.com - WNIL History
WNIL 1290 Facebook

NIL
Soft adult contemporary radio stations in the United States
Radio stations established in 1956
1956 establishments in Michigan